The Ngagyur Nyingma Nunnery Institute was founded by Penor Rinpoche in 1995. Buddhist nuns there study a nine-year course on sutra and tantra along with poetry, grammar, composition and so on, a syllabus virtually identical to that of Ngagyur Nyingma Institute. In 2002, the institute began sending teachers to teach in other nunneries including to India, Bhutan, and Nepal.

Related Academy with NNNI
 Ngagyur Nyingma Nunnery Jr. High School
 Ngagyur Nyingma Institute (NNI)

References

External links
 Namdroling Website
 Tsogyal Shedrub Dargyeling Nunnery
 Palyul Ling International 

Buddhist schools
Buildings and structures in Mysore district